The MDK-2M was a Soviet Cold War era artillery tractor.
It was based on the chassis of the AT-T, which itself is based on the chassis and drive system from the T-54 tank.

The MDK-2M were used for rapid digging of large coverages and for drawing tank trenches (digging depth up to 4.7 m width and grave 3.5 - 4m). The stored for shifts on the vehicle rear tiller is lowered for the milling hydraulically to the rear.

It was in service in the Soviet army, the Russian army, the East German army, and the Hungarian army.

References

External links
O. Protasov - AT-T heavy artillery tractor 

Military engineering vehicles of the Soviet Union